Reading Rainbow is an American educational children's television series that originally aired on PBS and afterward PBS Kids from July 11, 1983 to November 10, 2006, with reruns continuing to air until August 28, 2009. 155 30-minute episodes were produced over 21 seasons. Before its official premiere, the show aired for test audiences in the Nebraska and Buffalo, New York markets (their PBS member stations, the Nebraska ETV [now Nebraska Public Media] and WNED-TV, respectively, were co-producers of the show). 

The show was designed to encourage a love of books and reading among children. In 2012, an iPad and Kindle Fire educational interactive book reading and video field trip application was launched bearing the name of the program.

The public television series garnered over 200 broadcast awards, including a Peabody Award and 26 Emmy Awards, 10 of which were in the "Outstanding Children's Series" category. The concept of a reading series for children originated with Twila Liggett, PhD who in partnership with Cecily Truett Lancit and Larry Lancit, at Lancit Media Productions in New York created the television series. The original team also included Lynne Brenner Ganek, Ellen Schecter, and host LeVar Burton. The show's title was conceived by an unknown intern at WNED.

Each episode centered on a topic from a featured children's book that was explored through a number of on-location segments or stories. The show also recommended books for children to look for when they went to the library.

After the show's cancellation on November 10, 2006, reruns aired until August 28, 2009, when it was removed from the schedule.  At the time, it was the third-longest running children's series in PBS history, after Sesame Street and Mister Rogers' Neighborhood.  It was one of the first PBS shows to be broadcast in stereo. On June 20, 2012, the Reading Rainbow App was released for the iPad and, within 36 hours, became the #1 most-downloaded educational app in the iTunes App Store. Developed by LeVar Burton and his company, RRKIDZ, the app allows children to read unlimited books, explore video field trips starring Burton, and earn rewards for reading. On the week of July 11, 2013, Reading Rainbow celebrated its 30th anniversary.

In May 2014, a Kickstarter campaign was launched to raise funds to make the app available online and for Android, game consoles, smartphones, and other streaming devices along with creating a classroom version with the subscription fee waived for up to 13,000 disadvantaged classrooms. The effort met its initial fundraising goal of $1,000,000 in 11 hours, and ended a few days later at $5,408,916 from 105,857 backers. This campaign led to the launch of Skybrary by Reading Rainbow, a web-based expansion of the Reading Rainbow app experience.

Due to a legal dispute, licensing of the Reading Rainbow brand was revoked from RRKidz in October 2017, and all its platforms (including Skybrary) were rebranded to LeVar Burton Kids.

An interactive revival titled Reading Rainbow Live debuted on Looped in March 2022.

Show details
Reading Rainbow was hosted by actor and executive producer LeVar Burton, who was then known for his role in Roots. The show was produced first by Lancit Media Entertainment (1983-2001), and later On-Screen Entertainment (2002-2006). Every episode featured a different children's picture book, often narrated by a celebrity. The featured story's illustrations were scanned by the camera in a technique known as "iconographic animation" of each page shown in succession, although on certain occasions the shots would be animated.

After the featured story, Burton visited many places relating to the episode's theme, often featuring interviews with guests. The first episode of Season 6, which featured the book The Bionic Bunny Show by Marc Brown and his wife Laurene, included a behind-the-scenes look at the TV series Star Trek: The Next Generation, in which Burton was a main cast member. 

The last segment of each show, called Book Reviews, began with Burton's introductory catchphrase, "But you don't have to take my word for it," and featured children giving capsule reviews of books they liked. At the end of almost every episode, Burton signs-off with "I'll see you next time", with a review of the books featured in that episode.

The series' pilot, which was created and produced in 1981 and aired as the show's 8th episode in 1983, featured the book Gila Monsters Meet You at the Airport by Marjorie Weinman Sharmat and was narrated by Doug Parvin. Producer Larry Lancit's daughters, Shaune and Caitlin, were often featured in the series, notably as the children thanking the sponsors at the beginning and end of the show.

Theme song and opening sequence
The show's theme song was written by Steve Horelick, Dennis Neil Kleinman, and Janet Weir; the former also served as the series' music director and composer for all 155 episodes and received an Emmy nomination in 2007 for his work on the series. Over the show's 23-year run, it went through three different versions of the theme song. The original theme (used from 1983 to 1998) was performed by Tina Fabrique and featured one of the first uses of the Buchla synthesizer in a TV theme song. The original opening sequence, which consisted of an animated butterfly transforming the surroundings of young children reading books into animated fantasy lands, was used until November 13, 1998. The introductory animation was produced by Ovation Films, Inc. and designed and animated by Bill Davis. Some episodes (from 1983 through 1998) had the end credits having the full version of the 1983-1998 theme song (sung by the same singer --Tina Fabrique) --with some episodes (with the said song) repeating two or three times. 

On November 16, 1998, episodes began using a new live-action opening sequence and featured CGI in a space-themed world, with a new arrangement of the original song by Steve Horelick and performed by Johnny Kemp. A third intro was used starting on January 3, 2000, with a rerecorded version and the original lyrics performed by R&B artist Chaka Khan. This opening sequence is mostly the same as the second one, but features footage of Burton in place of some of the animated elements.

Final years as a TV series (2005–2006)
Original production of the series was to have ended after April 4, 2005, with the show continuing to air in reruns, but host LeVar Burton said on February 7, 2006, that five new episodes of the show would be shot the same year despite the continuing financial issues of PBS. The show aired its final original episode on November 10, 2006 and continued to air reruns until August 28, 2009.

Not only was PBS unable to secure enough funds to cover the costs associated with renewing broadcast rights and continuing reruns, the show's core philosophy was challenged as well. Reading Rainbow prominently featured published books throughout each episode, and licensing those books to be read aloud on the air was costly-- an expensive move that producing station WNED decided not to make. Prior to the cancellation, the Corporation for Public Broadcasting and the U.S. Department of Education provided funds for the production of Reading Rainbow and a number of other PBS children's series throughout the early 2000s. The "Ready to Learn" grant was designed for television programming that encourage early childhood learning and development. However, under the No Child Left Behind Act, this grant was focused much more narrowly toward programs that teach literacy skills, phonics, and spelling after 2005. Since Reading Rainbow was originally developed upon fostering a love of reading books, and not necessarily developing reading skills, the funding was redirected toward other programs, and led to the launch of new skills-based programming, like 
Super Why!, WordWorld, and a reboot of The Electric Company.

Relaunch as an app

Announcement and early developments (2010–2014)
Former executive producer LeVar Burton announced on his Twitter feed on March 19, 2010, that "Reading Rainbow 2.0 is in the works." In 2011, WNED, the PBS affiliate in Buffalo, New York that owns the Reading Rainbow brand, licensed rights to the brand to Burton and his company, RRKidz. On March 4, 2012, he announced that it was the "last day of shooting before launch!"

On June 13, 2012, in a special presentation at Apple Inc's annual World Wide Developers Conference, Burton and his business partner, Mark Wolfe, introduced the new Reading Rainbow iPad App. It became available in Apple's iTunes Store on June 20, 2012, and within 36 hours was the #1 educational app. In January 2014, the Reading Rainbow App surpassed 10M books read and video field trips watched by children in 18 months.

Kickstarter revival campaign and aftermath (2014–22)
On May 28, 2014, LeVar Burton started a Kickstarter fund to revive the show and materials. In under 12 hours the show had reached its $1 million goal. The new goal is to create an educational version for schools to use, free of cost to those schools in need, and help America get back to high literacy rates. They are also going to create a website for students to use to assist them with learning how to read.  The following day, May 29, 2014, they reached $2million (double their goal) at 1:15 pm. PST. The campaign raised $5,408,916 on Kickstarter with another $1million from Family Guy creator/animator Seth MacFarlane and $70,000 raised via direct contributions. The grand total was $6,478,916.

With 105,857 backers, the campaign holds Kickstarter's record for most backers and is the 8th highest amount raised on Kickstarter (as of June 1, 2015).

The first product of the Kickstarter campaign was Skybrary by Reading Rainbow. Launched in May 2015, it was a web based subscription service that duplicated the Reading Rainbow app experience. In addition to narrating many of the books, Burton hosted video fieldtrips which connected kids to real world experiences at places like NASA HQ and Niagara Falls.

In March 2016, RRKidz launched a new online educational service called Reading Rainbow Skybrary for Schools, which followed the same mission of the television series, while expanding to integrate into classroom curriculums.

In August 2017, WNED filed a wide-ranging lawsuit against Burton and RRKidz that demanded Burton's company hand over administrative access to other websites and social media accounts. The lawsuit also sought to enjoin Burton from using the Reading Rainbow catchphrase, "But you don't have to take my word for it," on his podcast.

In October 2017, WNED and RRKidz settled out of court. While the exact terms were confidential, the end result was that RRKidz was no longer a licensee of the Reading Rainbow brand.  RRKidz was rebranded LeVar Burton Kids and its services (including Skybrary) removed references to Reading Rainbow. In addition, Burton was allowed to continue using the Reading Rainbow catchphrase. Visiting the official Reading Rainbow website provided a page that stated "Recent legal disputes between WNED and LeVar Burton/RRKIDZ have been resolved and RRKIDZ no longer licenses the Reading Rainbow brand from WNED. WNED is currently working on the next chapter of Reading Rainbow and will continue its mission of fostering education for a new generation."

WNED announced in November 2018 that research and development had begun on a new Reading Rainbow program thanks to a $200,000 grant from The John R. Oishei Foundation.

Skybrary was acquired by Reading is Fundamental in March 2019.

In December 2021, it was announced that the show would be revived as Reading Rainbow Live, an interactive version featuring multiple hosts, dubbed "The Rainbows". The series debuted on Looped on March 6, 2022.

Accolades

Animation producers

Feature Book filming
The photographing of the Feature Book segments was by:
 Centron Films (1983–1987; renamed in 1986 to "Centron Productions Inc.")
 Loren Dolezal (1988–1998; renamed in 1995 to "Dolezal Animation"); Take Ten Animation teamed up with Dolezal from 1995 to 1998.
 On Screen Entertainment (2000–2006)
 Roger Holden, designer of the digital animation photography system used by Centron Films to film the Feature Book segments (1983–87)

Guest readers and contributors

 Marv Albert
 Jason Alexander (Pet Stories You Don't Have to Walk)
 Maya Angelou (All the Colors of the Race)
 Michael Ansara (The Gift of the Sacred Dog, Sheila MacGill-Callahan's and Barry Moser's And Still the Turtle Watched)
 Lucie Arnaz (When Aunt Lena Did the Rhumba)
 Edward Asner (Dinosaur Bob and His Adventures with the Family Lazardo)
 James Avery (Berlioz the Bear, Game Day)
 Hoyt Axton (Meanwhile Back at the Ranch)
 Julia Barr (Raccoons and Ripe Corn, Deer at the Brook, Come Out, Muskrats)
 Angela Bassett (The Wonderful Towers of Watts)
 Orson Bean (The Runaway Duck)
 Philip Bosco (Desert Giant: The World of the Saguaro Cactus)
 Reizl Bozyk (Mrs. Katz and Tush)
 Wayne Brady (Mr. George Baker)
 Jeff Bridges (The Tin Forest)
 Fran Brill (Dive to the Coral Reefs)
 Matthew Broderick (Owen)
 Ruth Buzzi (Miss Nelson is Back)
 David Canary (Work Song)
 Jose Canseco
 Diahann Carroll (Show Way)
 Dixie Carter (Come a Tide)
 Lacey Chabert (Snowy Day: Stories and Poems)
 Julia Child (Florence and Eric Take the Cake)
 Roy Clark (Barn Dance)
 Kevin Clash (Elmo from Sesame Street)
 Imogene Coca (Imogene's Antlers)
 James Coco (Perfect the Pig)
 Tim Conway (The Secret Shortcut)
 Bill Cosby (Arthur's Eyes, Dennis Nolan's Big Pig)
 Denise Crosby
 Jim Cummings (Frog and Toad)
 Jane Curtin (Duncan and Dolores)
 Tyne Daly (Amazing Grace)
 Keith David (Follow the Drinking Gourd)
 Ossie Davis (Summer)
 Ruby Dee (Simon's Book, Tar Beach, Badger's Parting Gifts)
 Josie de Guzman (Saturday Sancocho)
 Brian Dennehy (Kate Shelley and the Midnight Express)
 Phyllis Diller (Ludlow Laughs)
 Michael Dorn
 Ann Duquesnay (Hip Cat)
 Eliza Dushku (Unique Monique)
 Buddy Ebsen (Steven Kellogg's Paul Bunyan)
 Georgia Engel (Chickens Aren't the Only Ones)
 Hector Elizondo (Brush)
 Fernando Escandon (Hill of Fire)
 Lola Falana (Sophie and Lou)
 Peter Falk (The Robbery at the Diamond Dog Diner)
 Jamie Farr (The Sign Painter's Dream)
 Barbara Feldon (The Life Cycle of the Honeybee)
 Tovah Feldshuh (The Piggy in the Puddle)
 Ron Foster (My Little Island)
 Jonathan Frakes
 Vincent Gardenia (Louis the Fish, The Adventures of Taxi Dog)
 Richard Gere
 Jack Gilford (The Purple Coat)
 Whoopi Goldberg
 Jane Goodall
 Robert Guillaume (My Shadow)
 Lorne Greene (Ox-Cart Man)
 Ed Harris (Enemy Pie)
 Jo Hayden (Martha Speaks)
 Jim Henson (Kermit the Frog from The Muppets)
 William Hickey (Dennis Nolan's Monster Bubbles: A Counting Book, Willi Glasauer's (Greetings from the Surreal)
 Gregory Hines (Zin! Zin! Zin! A Violin)
 Anna Holbrook (Regina's Big Mistake)
 Lena Horne (Snowy Day: Stories and Poems)
 Beth Howland (If You Give a Mouse a Cookie)
 Scott Irby-Ranniar (My Life with the Wave)
 Anne Jackson (Stellaluna)
 Victoria Jackson (Tooth-Gnasher Superflash)
 James Earl Jones (Bringing the Rain to Kapiti Plain)
 Raul Julia (Mystery on the Docks)
 Madeline Kahn (Bea and Mr. Jones)
 Carol Kane (Someplace Else)
 Charles Kimbrough (June 29, 1999)
 Regina King (Max)
 Eartha Kitt (Is This a House for Hermit Crab?)
 Linda Lavin (Ruth Law Thrills a Nation)
 Robin Leach
 Michael Learned (Appelemando's Dreams)
 Maya Lin
 Viveca Lindfors (Rechenka's Eggs)
 Amy Linker (A Chair for My Mother)
 Keye Luke (The Paper Crane)
 Michele Mariana (Stay Away from the Junkyard!)
 Olga Merediz (Borreguita and the Coyote)
 Andrea McArdle (Lemonade for Sale)
 Gates McFadden
 Bobby McFerrin
 Mark McGwire
 Marilyn Michaels (Gregory the Terrible Eater)
 Stephanie Mills (Bea and Mr. Jones)
 Helen Mirren (How to Make an Apple Pie and See the World)
 Robert Morse (Sunken Treasure)
 Fred Newman (Mama Don't Allow, Fox on the Job)
 Jerry Orbach (Germs Make Me Sick!)
 Corinne Orr (Aliki's Mummies Made in Egypt)
 Frank Oz (Fozzie Bear from The Muppets)
 Jane Pauley (Humphrey the Lost Whale: A True Story)
 Peter Pitofsky
 Faith Prince (Nosey Mrs. Rat)
 Freddie Prinze Jr. (Beegu)
 Keshia Knight Pulliam (The Magic School Bus: Inside the Earth)
 Gilda Radner (The Tortoise and the Hare)
 Phylicia Rashad (Mufaro's Beautiful Daughters)
 Lou Rawls (Ty's One Man Band)
 Alaina Reed (The Milk Makers)
 Lionel Richie
 Jason Robards (Sam the Sea Cow)
 Al Roker (Hail to Mail)
 Zelda Rubinstein (A Three Hat Day)
 Run-D.M.C.
 Lea Salonga (Silent Lotus, My America: A Poetry Atlas of the United States)
 Isabel Sanford (The Patchwork Quilt)
 Susan Sarandon (The Shaman's Apprentice: A Tale of the Amazon Rainforest)
 Josh Saviano (Little Nino's Pizzeria)
 John Sebastian
 Pete Seeger (Abiyoyo)
 Martin Short (Animal Cafe)
 Marina Sirtis
 Phoebe Snow (The Gift of the Sacred Dog)
 Brent Spiner
 Arnold Stang (Alistair in Outer Space, Alistair's Time Machine, Archibald Frisby)
 Stomp
 Patrick Stewart (On the Day You Were Born)
 Jerry Stiller (Digging Up Dinosaurs)
 Regina Taylor (Uncle Jed's Barber Shop)
 Lynne Thigpen (The Salamander Room)
 Sada Thompson (Keep the Lights Burning, Abbie)
 Lauren Tom (Liang and the Magic Paintbrush)
 Michelle Trachtenberg (Math Curse)
 Alex Trebek
 Leslie Uggams (Jack, the Seal and the Sea)
 Ben Vereen (Ty's One Man Band)
 Ralph Waite (Rumplestilitskin)
 Bree Walker
 Eli Wallach (Once There Was a Tree)
 Adam West (The Bionic Bunny Show)
 Steve Whitmire (Waldo C. Graphic from The Muppets)
 William Windom (Hot-Air Henry)
 Michael Winslow (Space Case)
 Hattie Winston (Galimoto)
 Alfre Woodard (Visiting Day)

Writing and illustrating contest

In 1995, the creators launched the first contest called "Reading Rainbow Young Writers and Illustrators Contest". The annual writing and illustrating competition for children grades K through 3 continued until 2009 when it was relaunched as "PBS Kids Go! Writers Contest". It was renamed to the PBS Kids Writers Contest in 2014.

References

External links

 
 ReadingRainbow.com Reading Rainbow website by RRKidz, Inc.
 Reading Rainbow App for Kindle Fire on the Amazon Appstore
 Reading Rainbow App for iPad on the Apple App Store

 
1983 American television series debuts
2006 American television series endings
1980s American children's television series
1990s American children's television series
2000s American children's television series
American children's adventure television series
American children's education television series
American children's fantasy television series
American television series with live action and animation
English-language education television programming
Kickstarter-funded software
PBS Kids shows
PBS original programming
Personal development television series
Reading and literacy television series
Star Trek